Abhaynagar is an upazila of Jessore District in the Division of Khulna, Bangladesh.

History

During the Bangladesh Liberation war, staff of the Noapara Railway Station were killed by members of Pakistan Army on 27 March 1971. The Pakistan Army killed 17 members of Mukti Bahini including Assistant Secretary of Bangladesh Awami League Nazibor Rahman.

On 4 December 2005 over 300,000 people of Abhaynagar took to the roads and blocked the Jessore-Khulna Highway in the Nowapaara industrial area to protest against a longstanding waterlogging problem. The protest took place after 25,000 people took part in a silt removal drive in the Sri River at Vobodoho sluice gate on November 9. Over 100 people were injured in violent clashes during the protest.

Demographics
In the 1991 Bangladesh census, Abhaynagar's population was 204,654, with males constituting 52.06% of the population and females 47.94%. The population aged 18 or over was 110,761, with a literacy rate of 38.8% (7+ years) compared to a national average of 32.4%.

, Abhaynagar had a population of 262,434. Males constituted 50.24% of the population and females 49.76%. Muslims formed 80.65% of the population, Hindus 18.70%, Christians 0.10% and others 0.55%. Abhaynagar had a literacy rate of 59.8% for the population 7 years and above.

Economy
The principal agricultural products are rice, wheat, jute, potatoes, garlic, onions, mustard, betel nuts, brinjal and vegetables. The principal industrial products are jute, textiles, leather, salt and cement:

Points of interest
Among the archeological interests in Abhaynagar are Siddhipasha Rajbari with its adjacent tank and temple, 11 Duari Mandir, Madhayapur Neelkuthi and Sreedharpur Zamindar Bari. Three periodicals are published: the weekly Mukti and Uddipan, and the monthly Mukul.

Administration
Abhaynagar Upazila is divided into Abhaynagar Municipality and eight union parishads: Baghutia, Chalishia, Payra, Prambag, Siddhipasha, Sreedharpur, Subha Para, and Sundoli. The union parishads are subdivided into 89 mauzas and 106 villages.

See also
Upazilas of Bangladesh
Districts of Bangladesh
Divisions of Bangladesh

References

External links

Upazilas of Jessore District
Jashore District
Khulna Division